Two Little Boys is a 2012 New Zealand feature film based on the 2008 novel of the same name by Duncan Sarkies. It stars Bret McKenzie and Hamish Blake in the two title roles, and is directed by Robert Sarkies. Duncan Sarkies served as a script writer, adapting his own novel.

Synopsis
Nige (Bret McKenzie) and Deano (Hamish Blake) are two childhood friends who live in Invercargill in the South Island of New Zealand. However, estrangement has since resulted, because Nige has stopped flatting with Deano over concerns about Nige's self-perceived emotional dependence on his friend, and moved in with a third friend, Gav (Maaka Pohatu). However, Nige inadvertently runs over and kills a person from Norway engaging in backpacker tourism with his unreliable Ford Laser, and enlists the assistance of Deano to conceal the body, although not without reservations from Deano due to his 'abandonment' issues after Nige terminated their earlier flatting cohabitation. The film also deals with the consequently bungled and incompetent police investigation into the comedy of errors that produced this chain of events, with humorous consequences.

Release
It premiered at the Berlin film festival in February 2012. It was initially due to open in New Zealand on 15 March 2012, but that date was later pushed back to later in the year. A wide release is planned for later in the year. The release date was then later shown on the Facebook page of Two Little Boys.

Two Little Boys was in New Zealand cinemas by 20 September, following the New Zealand premiere held in Invercargill on 11 September.

Production
Filming started in 2010 in the Southland District, New Zealand and concluded in 2011. The first trailer was released in early 2012 showing the original release date before the change.

Car
The yellow car that Nige (Bret) drives when he ran over a backpacker (Filip) is a 1982 Ford Laser which is on display at The Movie and TV Museum in Waipu, New Zealand.

References

External links
 

New Zealand drama films
Films shot in New Zealand
2012 films
Films based on New Zealand novels
Films set in New Zealand
Invercargill in fiction
2010s English-language films